The 2008–09 Mid-American Conference women's basketball season began with practices in October 2008, followed by the start of the 2008–09 NCAA Division I women's basketball season in November. Conference play began in January 2009 and concluded in March 2009. Bowling Green won the regular season title with a record of 15–1 by one game over Ball State. Lauren Prochaska of Bowling Green was named MAC player of the year.

West Division winner Ball State won the MAC tournament over Bowling Green. Tracy Pontius of Bowling Green was the tournament MVP. 
Ball State defeated defending national champion Tennessee in the first round of the NCAA tournament before losing to Iowa State in the second round. Bowling Green reached the third round the WNIT.

Preseason awards
The preseason poll was announced by the league office on October 30, 2008.

Preseason women's basketball poll
(First place votes in parenthesis)

East Division
 
 
 
 Ohio

West Division

Honors

Postseason

Mid–American tournament

NCAA tournament

Women's National Invitational Tournament

Postseason awards

Coach of the Year: Curt Miller, Bowling Green and Tricia Cullop, Toledo
Player of the Year: Lauren Prochaska, Bowling Green
Freshman of the Year: Brandie Baker, Central Michigan
Defensive Player of the Year: Porchia Green, Ball State
Sixth Man of the Year: Marke Freeman, Northern Illinois

Honors

See also
2008–09 Mid-American Conference men's basketball season

References